Grigor Dimitrov defeated David Goffin in the final, 7–5, 4–6, 6–3 to win the singles tennis title at the 2017 ATP Finals. Dimitrov became the first debutant to win the title since Àlex Corretja in 1998, and it marked the first time since 2008 that two first-time finalists contested the title.	

Andy Murray was the defending champion, but did not qualify for the event this year due to injury. This marked the first time since 2013 that he failed to qualify.

Of the nine participants from the previous year, only Marin Čilić, Dominic Thiem and Goffin returned this year. Stan Wawrinka qualified but could not participate due to injury. Former world No. 1 and five-time champion Novak Djokovic failed to qualify for the first time since 2006, having ended his season early due to an elbow injury.

Alexander Zverev, Dimitrov, Jack Sock and Pablo Carreño Busta (as an alternate replacing Rafael Nadal) made their debuts. Goffin made his debut as a direct qualifier, after playing one match as an alternate in 2016.

Roger Federer participated in the Tour Finals for a record-extending 15th time, but was defeated in the semifinals by Goffin. Goffin became only the fifth player in history to defeat both Nadal and Federer at the same tournament.

Seeds

Alternates

Draw

Finals

Group Pete Sampras
Standings are determined by: 1. number of wins; 2. number of matches; 3. in two-players-ties, head-to-head records; 4. in three-players-ties, percentage of sets won, then percentage of games won, then head-to-head records; 5. ATP rankings.

Group Boris Becker
Standings are determined by: 1. number of wins; 2. number of matches; 3. in two-players-ties, head-to-head records; 4. in three-players-ties, percentage of sets won, then percentage of games won, then head-to-head records; 5. ATP rankings.

References

External links 
Official Website
Main Draw Singles

Singles